Mukhu Gimbatovich Aliyev (born August 6, 1940) is a Russian politician who served as the 2nd Head of the Republic of Dagestan, a federal subject of Russia. He was born in the village of Tanusi, Khunzakhsky District, Dagestan ASSR, Russian SFSR, Soviet Union. Ethnically, he is Avar. He was the speaker of the Republic's parliament before being accepted as the President by the Dagestan parliament on February 20, 2006, having been nominated by the Russian President Vladimir Putin to replace Dagestan's long-time leader Magomedali Magomedov.

Aliyev was succeeded by Magomedsalam Magomedov on February 20, 2010. In line with the Russian Federation's constitution, Magomedov was nominated by federal President Dmitry Medvedev and approved by the republic's People's Assembly.

Honours and awards
 Order "For Merit to the Fatherland":
2nd class (February 18, 2010) – for services to the state and personal contribution to the socio-economic development of the republic
3rd class (November 14, 2005) – for outstanding contribution to strengthening Russian statehood and the merits of legislative activity
4th class (December 25, 2000) – for his courage and dedication shown during the performance of their civic duty to protect the constitutional order of the Republic of Dagestan, strengthening friendship and cooperation between nations and years of diligent work
 Order of the Red Banner of Labour
 Order of the Badge of Honour

Major achievements
Although reign of Mukhu Aliyev was smooth without any major breakthroughs Mukhu is famous in Dagestan in standing against transfer of two villages located on Russia/Azerbaijan border to Azerbaijan.

References

1940 births
Living people
Party leaders of the Soviet Union
Full Cavaliers of the Order "For Merit to the Fatherland"
Recipients of the Order of Honour (Russia)
Recipients of the Order of the Red Banner of Labour
Heads of the Republic of Dagestan
Avar people